The Kavrayskiy VII projection is a map projection invented by Soviet cartographer Vladimir V. Kavrayskiy in 1939 for use as a general-purpose pseudocylindrical projection. Like the Robinson projection, it is a compromise intended to produce good-quality maps with low distortion overall. It scores well in that respect compared to other popular projections, such as the Winkel tripel, despite straight, evenly spaced parallels and a simple formulation. Regardless, it has not been widely used outside the former Soviet Union.

The projection is defined as

See also

 List of map projections
 Cartography
 Wagner VI projection
 Robinson projection

References

External links

 Curvature in Map Projections, quantification of overall distortion in projections.
 Mapthematics Kavrayskiy VII, bivariate distortion map.
 Deducing the Kavrayskiy VII Projection, description of the properties of the Kavrayskiy VII projection.

Map projections
Soviet inventions
Geography of the Soviet Union